Clarence is a masculine given name. Notable people with the name include:

 Clarence Applegran (1893–1960), American football player and basketball coach
 Clarence Albert Bacote (1906–1981), American historian and activist
 Clarence Bailey (1963–2006), American football player
 Clarence Birdseye (1886–1956), pioneer of frozen food
 Clarence Burton (1882–1933), American actor
 Clarence G. Burton (1886–1982), American politician
 Clarence M. Burton (1853–1932), American lawyer, businessman, historian and philanthropist
 Clarence Carnes  (1927–1988), American fugitive
 Clarence Carter (born 1936), blind US soul singer and musician
 Clarence Clemons (1942–2011), American musician, saxophonist for the E Street Band
 Clarence Gilyard (1955–2022), American university professor, actor and author
 Clarence Goodson (born 1982), US footballer
 Clarence Henry (boxer) (1926–1999), American boxer
 Clarence "Frogman" Henry (born 1937), American rhythm and blues singer and pianist
 Clarence Holbrook Carter (1904–2000), US painter
 Clarence Janecek (1911–1990), NFL player
 Clarence Johnson (1910–1990), US aeronautical engineer
 Clarence Darrow (1857–1938), US lawyer
 Clarence Kolster (1895–1972), American film editor
 Clarence Edward Mathias (1876–1935), US Sergeant major, Medal of Honor recipient
 Clarence P. LeMire (1886–1961), judge of the United States Tax Court
 Clarence D. Martin (1886–1955), 11th Governor of the state of Washington
 Clarence R. Martin (1886–1972), Justice of the Indiana Supreme Court 
 Clarence Moore (disambiguation), several people with this name
 Clarence Nash (1904–1985), American voice actor
 Clarence Charles Newcomer (1923–2005), US District Judge of the United States District Court for the Eastern District of Pennsylvania
 Clarence J. Roberts (1873–1931), Justice of the New Mexico Supreme Court
 Clarence Saunders (athlete), Bermudian high jumper
 Clarence Saunders (grocer), US American retailer, pioneer of supermarkets
 Clarence Scharbauer (1879–1942), American rancher.
 Clarence Schmalz (1916–1981), Canadian ice hockey administrator
 Clarence Seedorf, Dutch footballer
 Clarence Smith (disambiguation), several people
 Clarence A. Southerland (1889–1973), Chief Justice of the Delaware Supreme Court
 Clarence Thomas, Associate Justice of the Supreme Court of the United States
 Clarence Wijewardena, Sri Lankan guitarist and vocalist
 Clarence Williams III (1939-2021), American actor
 Clarence Wiseman, Canadian clergy, the tenth general of The Salvation Army

In fiction
 Clarence (Razor) Callahan, the main antagonist in the 2005 video game Need for Speed: Most Wanted
 Clarence Odbody, a guardian angel from the 1946 film It's a Wonderful Life
 Lumpy Rutherford, a recurring character in Leave It to Beaver, an American TV series
 Clarence Wendell, the main character in the Cartoon Network TV show Clarence
 The title character of Clarence, a 1988 British TV series, portrayed by Ronnie Barker

Masculine given names
English masculine given names